The UK Dance Singles Chart is a music chart compiled in the United Kingdom by the Official Charts Company (OCC) from sales of songs in the dance music genre (EDM, house, drum and bass, synthpop, dance-pop, etc.) in record stores and digital downloads.

These are the song which reached number one on the UK Dance Singles Chart in 2007. The dates listed in the menus below represent the Saturday after the Sunday the chart was announced, as per the way the dates are given in chart publications such as the ones produced by Billboard, Guinness, and Virgin.

Chart history

See also
List of number-one singles of 2007 (UK)
List of UK Independent Singles Chart number ones of 2007
List of UK Rock & Metal Singles Chart number ones of 2007
List of UK Dance Albums Chart number ones of 2007

References
General

Specific

External links
Dance Singles Chart at The Official UK Charts Company
UK Top 40 Dance Singles at BBC Radio 1

2007
2007 in British music
United Kingdom Dance Singles